Olea europaea subsp. cuspidata is a subspecies of the well-known olive tree (Olea europaea), which until recently was considered a separate species (Olea africana) and is still mentioned as such in many sources. Native to northeast of Africa and the drier parts of subtropical Asia, it has various common names, including wild olive, African olive, brown olive and Indian olive. 

It is the ancestor of the cultivated olive and it has been introduced to Australia, New Zealand and the US. It is an aggressive invasive species that can infest dry woodland areas, riparian zones, headlands and dune systems.

Description

Leaf margins are entire and recurved, the upper surface is grey-green and glossy, and the lower surface has a dense covering of silvery, golden or brown scales.

Inflorescence and fruit
The flowers are small and inconspicuous, which usually appear in spring. The two stamens are fused near the top of the corolla tube, with bilobed stigma. 

The fruit is edible but bitter.

Distribution
It is extensively found through Africa (i.e. Egypt, Eastern Africa, Central Africa and Southern Africa), the Mascarenes (i.e. Mauritius and Réunion), western Asia (i.e. Arabian Peninsula, Afghanistan and Iran), the Indian sub-continent (i.e. northern India, Nepal and Pakistan) and western China. Subtropical dry forests of Olea europaea cuspidata are found in the Himalayan subtropical broadleaf forests ecoregion.  

In areas where it is not native, such as Australia, it is classified as an environmental weed spread mainly by birds eating the fruit. It is widely naturalized in New South Wales, Victoria, South Australia and Western Australia, where it is found in bushlands, parks, roadsides and waste areas on the coast and in highlands, where it would alter the original composition of the native vegetation. It was first introduced to Australia in the mid 19th century for ornamental reasons.

Uses
The wood is much-prized and durable, with a strong smell similar to bay rum, and is used for fine furniture and turnery. The wood is strong, hard, durable and heavy and resistant to termites and wood borers. The spindle wood is very light, while the heartwood is dark yellow to reddish brown.

This species is cultivated as an ornamental tree for parks and gardens. It is also used for the production of table olives and oil. The sap of the fruit of this tree can also be used to make ink.

Gallery

References

External links

europaea subsp. cuspidata
Plant subspecies
Trees of Africa
Trees of the Arabian Peninsula
Trees of Western Asia
Trees of China
Trees of the Indian subcontinent
Invasive plant species in Australia